The Mayor of Erigavo is the chief executive of the city of Erigavo, the capital of Sanaag region in Somaliland. The current mayor is Ismail Haji Nour, who took office on 23 December 2012.

List of mayors

See also
 Mayor of Berbera
 Mayor of Burao
 Mayor of Borama
 Mayor of Hargeisa
 Mayor of Las Anod

References

Mayors of places in Somaliland